The 1989 UCLA Bruins football team was an American football team that represented the University of California, Los Angeles during the 1989 NCAA Division I-A football season.  In their 14th year under head coach Terry Donahue, the Bruins compiled a 3–7–1 record  (2–5–1 Pac-10) and finished in ninth place in the Pacific-10 Conference. After going 3–7 in the first 10 games, the Bruins tied #8-ranked USC, 10-10, in the final game of the season at the Los Angeles Memorial Coliseum.

UCLA's offensive leaders in 1989 were quarterback Bret Johnson with 1,791 passing yards, running back Brian Brown with 463 rushing yards, and wide receiver Mike Farr with 471 receiving yards.

Schedule

Personnel

Players and awards
 Charles Arbuckle – tight end (309 receiving yards)
 Frank Cornish – center (1st-team pick by Football News on 1989 All-America team)
 Mike Farr – wide receiver (471 receiving yards)
 Bret Johnson – quarterback (1,791 passing yards)
 Kirk Magio – punter (1st-team pick by The Sporting News on All-America team; 1st-team pick on 1989 All-Pacific-10 Conference football team)
 Scott Miller – wide receiver (414 receiving yards)
 Kevin Williams – running back (380 rushing yards)
 Shawn Wills – running back (440 rushing yards)
 Jeff O'Flannagan – Defensive Back (31 interceptions)

References

UCLA
UCLA Bruins football seasons
UCLA Bruins football